Defenders Football Club is a professional football club based in Homagama, Sri Lanka. In 2018, Sri Lanka Army SC was renamed to Defenders FC. The team is under the patronage of the Sri Lanka Army.

Honours
Sri Lanka Champions League: 2
Winners: 2008–09, 2018–19
Sri Lanka FA Cup: 7
Winners: 1961, 1968, 2011, 2013–14, 2016, 2017, 2018

Performance in AFC competitions
AFC President's Cup: 2 appearances
2009: Group Stage
2013: Group Stage
AFC Cup: 1 appearances
2020: Preliminary round 1

Continental record

Current squad

Reference

External links 

Football clubs in Sri Lanka
Military association football clubs